Yuri Farzunovich Gazzaev (born 27 November 1960) is a Russian professional football coach and a former player.

Playing career
As a player, he made his debut in the Soviet First League in 1978 for FC Spartak Ordzhonikidze.

He signed for Chamois Niortais F.C. on a fake paperwork, pretending he was 9 years younger than he actually was (his birth year was changed from 1960 to 1969). He was released a few months later after the fraud was discovered.

Personal life
His son Ruslan Gazzayev was a professional footballer.

References

External links
 1991 career at Tempo (Serbia magazine) #1338, pgs.2–3

1960 births
Sportspeople from Vladikavkaz
Living people
Soviet footballers
Russian footballers
Soviet Top League players
FC Spartak Vladikavkaz players
FC Dynamo Moscow players
FC Lokomotiv Moscow players
PFC Spartak Nalchik players
FK Mačva Šabac players
Aris Thessaloniki F.C. players
Vasa IFK players
Chamois Niortais F.C. players
Russian football managers
FC KAMAZ Naberezhnye Chelny managers
Russian expatriate footballers
Expatriate footballers in Yugoslavia
Expatriate footballers in Greece
Expatriate footballers in Finland
Expatriate footballers in France
PFC Krylia Sovetov Samara managers
Russian Premier League managers
FC Shinnik Yaroslavl managers
Soviet expatriate sportspeople in Yugoslavia
Soviet expatriate footballers
FC Volgar Astrakhan managers
FC Spartak Vladikavkaz managers
FC Yenisey Krasnoyarsk players
Association football forwards
Russian football chairmen and investors
FC Yenisey Krasnoyarsk managers